Sergio Cecotti (born 23 October 1956) is an Italian politician, former Mayor of Udine and former President of Friuli-Venezia Giulia.

Biography

Academic career 
Cecotti graduated in physics at the University of Pisa in 1979 and has worked at the Harvard University, at the UCLA, at the CERN in Geneva (where he worked with Nobel Prize recipient Carlo Rubbia) and at the ICTP in Trieste.

He has taught physics at the University of Pisa and at the International School for Advanced Studies of Trieste.

Political career 
In 1993, Cecotti joined the Northern League, with which he has been elected to the regional council of Friuli-Venezia Giulia. He has been President of Friuli-Venezia Giulia for a few months between 1995 and 1996, with the support of his party and of the Olive Tree.

In December 1998, Cecotti is elected Mayor of Udine with the Northern League, leaving the party in 2003 after criticizing its subalternity to Forza Italia, and founding Convergence for Udine. After leaving the League, in June 2003 Cecotti is re-elected for a second mayoral term: this time, Cecotti was supported by the centre-left Olive Tree coalition. Cecotti held his seat for 10 years overall. On 14 February 2007 Cecotti decided to transform Convergence for Udine into a regional party, called Convergence for Friuli (Convergenza per il Friuli). The party was represented in the Regional Council of Friuli-Venezia Giulia by Mario Puiatti, elected in 2003 for the Greens.

In 2018, Cecotti founded the political movement Pact for Autonomy, an autonomism political party in Friuli-Venezia Giulia, which aims to protect all linguistic minorities in the region, and with which he ran again for the office of President of Friuli-Venezia Giulia at the 2018 regional election, ranking fourth.

References

External links
Official website of Convergence for Friuli

1956 births
Living people
People from Udine
Lega Nord politicians
20th-century Italian politicians
21st-century Italian politicians
Mayors of Udine
University of Pisa alumni
People associated with CERN